The Knute Rockne Bowl (named after football coach Knute Rockne) was played as the NCAA College Division East Regional championship from 1969 to 1972, one of four national quarterfinals.  After an absence of three seasons, it was a Division II national semifinal game in 1976 and 1977, along with the Grantland Rice Bowl.

Champions

East regional championship
NCAA College Division

NCAA Division II Semifinal

See also
List of college bowl games
Grantland Rice Bowl
NCAA Division II Football Championship
NCAA Division III Football Championship

References

Defunct college football bowls
NCAA Division II football